Manchester Medieval Studies is a series of books on medieval history published by Manchester University Press. The series is intended for the non-specialist reader and attempts to combine traditional scholarship with the latest academic approaches to the subjects covered.

Titles
This is an incomplete list of titles in the series:
Hamilton, Louis I. A sacred city: Consecrating churches and reforming society in eleventh-century Italy.  
Poleg, Eyal. Approaching the Bible in medieval England.  
Rigby, S.H. Chaucer in context: Society, allegory and gender.  
Radulescu, Raluca, Alison Truelove (Eds.) Gentry culture in late-medieval England.  
L'Estrange, Elizabeth. Holy motherhood: Gender, dynasty and visual culture in the later middle ages.  
Veach, Colin. Lordship in four realms: The Lacy family, 1166–1241.  
Musson, Anthony. Medieval law in context: The growth of legal consciousness from Magna Carta to the Peasants' Revolt.

References 

Series of history books
University of Manchester